Krupac (Cyrillic: Крупац) is a settlement in the municipality of Konjic, Bosnia and Herzegovina, and the south-eastern hamlet of the village of Glavatičevo.

Demographics 
According to the 2013 census, its population was 54.

References

Populated places in Konjic
Glavatičevo